Mappila Bay (or Moppila Bay) is a natural harbor situated at Ayikkara in Kannur Municipal Corporation, Kerala state of South India. On one side of the bay is Fort St. Angelo, built by the Portuguese in the 15th century and the other side is the Arakkal Palace.
 
The bay was famous during the Kolathiri's regime as a commercial harbour that linked Kolathunadu with Lakshadweep and foreign countries, in imports.

See also

 Ayikkara
 St. Angelo Fort
 Arakkal Kingdom
 Cannanore Lighthouse
 Kannur

References

Beaches of Kerala
Transport in Kannur
Ports and harbours of Kerala
Geography of Kannur district